From Then Until is the reissue of American recording artist Raven-Symoné's second studio album Undeniable (1999). It was released on October 31, 2006, by TMG Records, seven years after its original.

Background 
After the success of Raven's third album, This Is My Time (2004), Crash Records sold their rights to the material on Undeniable to TMG Records, who in cooperation with RayBlaize and her then-current label Hollywood Records, re-released it on October 31, 2006 as, From Then Until.  The re-release included the music video for "With A Child's Heart" as well as some behind-the-scenes footage and live performances. However, From Then Until has only half of the International House Mix of "With a Child's Heart", and there are three unlisted tracks at the end of the disc, none of which are performed by Raven-Symoné.

Track listing 
 "People Make the World Go Round" – 3:48
 "Best Friends" – 4:16
 "Slow Down" – 4:26
 "Hip Hoppers" – 4:04
 "I Can Get Down" – 2:31
 "Bounce" – 3:18
 "With a Child's Heart" (Uptempo) – 3:54
 "I Love You" – 4:51
 "Lean on Me" – 2:42
 "With a Child's Heart" (Ballad Version) – 5:34
 "Pure Love" (International Remix) – 3:29
 "With a Child's Heart" (International House Mix) – 1:58
 "Big Thangz" – 1:39
 "Incomplete" – 1:29
 "Ear Candy" – 0:51

References 

2006 albums
Reissue albums